Karl-Marx-Hof (English: Karl Marx Court) is one of the best-known Gemeindebauten (English: municipal housing complexes) in Vienna, situated in Heiligenstadt, a neighbourhood of the 19th district of Vienna, Döbling.

At over a kilometre in length –  – and spanning four Straßenbahn (tram) stops, Karl-Marx-Hof is one of the longest single residential buildings in the world.

Development
Karl-Marx-Hof was built on land that, until the 12th century, had been under the waters of the Danube, deep enough for ships to travel over the area.

By 1750, all that remained was a pool of water, which was drained on the order of Holy Roman Emperor Joseph II. Gardens were then built in the area, but these were removed by the Vienna city council, then under the "Red Vienna" period of control by the Social Democratic Party of Austria to make room for the erection of Karl-Marx-Hof, financed by a special tax named after councillor Hugo Breitner, commissioning locally and internationally renowned architects.

Karl-Marx-Hof was built between 1927 and 1930 by city planner Karl Ehn, a follower of Otto Wagner. It held 1,382 apartments (with a size of 30–60 m2 each). Only 18.5% of the 156,000 m2-large area was built up, with the rest of the area developed into play areas and gardens. Designed for a population of about 5,000, the premises include many amenities, including laundromats, baths, kindergartens, a library, doctor's offices, and business offices.

Austrian Civil War, Austrofascism, and the Anschluss

Karl-Marx-Hof was well known during the February Uprising of the 1934 Austrian Civil War. Those insurgents engaged in the revolt barricaded themselves inside the building and were forced to surrender after the Austrian army, the police, and the Austrofascist paramilitary Heimwehr bombarded the site regardless of the unarmed dwellers, mainly worker families, with light artillery.  During the Anschluss, Karl-Marx-Hof was renamed Heiligenstädter Hof, but took its original name back in 1945.

Today
The heavy artillery damage to Karl-Marx-Hof was repaired in the 1950s. It has been used as a filming location for some movies, most notably The Night Porter.  The building was refurbished between 1989 and 1992.

See also

Red Vienna
Heiligenstadt, Vienna

Other very long housing blocks
Byker Wall, Newcastle upon Tyne, UK
Park Hill, Sheffield, UK
Falowiec, Gdansk, Poland
Le Lignon, Switzerland

References

External links
Video on the Karl-Marx-Hof and Red Vienna

Residential buildings in Vienna
Public housing in Austria
Residential buildings completed in 1930
Buildings and structures in Döbling
Austrian Civil War
1930 establishments in Austria
20th-century architecture in Austria